Joany Kane is an American screenwriter from Massachusetts. She came up with the idea of the OTT streaming platform, Passionflix, got the URL, and in 2017, co-founded it with Tosca Musk and Jina Panebianco. She wrote her first screenplay in 1991. She also writes romance ebooks.

Works
Screenplays
 The Christmas Card
 A Christmas Kiss
 Moonlight and Mistletoe
 The Will
 Christmas Magic

Books
 The Remote Seduction
 Operation Naughty
 The Memory Agent & Fool Me Once
 Miss Annie And The Chief
 A Villain's Kiss
 The Realm Warrior

References

Living people
American screenwriters
Year of birth missing (living people)
Writers from Massachusetts
American women screenwriters
American romantic fiction writers
American women novelists
American web producers
21st-century American women